Karta may refer to:

Places
 Karta, Iran, a village in Izeh County, Khuzestan Province, Iran
 Karta, Andika, a village in Andika County, Khuzestan Province, Iran
 Kharta or Karta, a Himalayan region in Tibet
 Kangaroo Island or Karta, an island in South Australia

Other uses
 Karta (orangutan) (1982–2017), a Sumatran orangutan
 KARTA Center, a Polish NGO
 Karta Palace, a 17th-century palace in Central Java
 Melakarta or karta, a parent raga of South Indian classical music
 Kārta, a goddess in Latvian mythology
 Karta, a senior person in a Hindu joint family

See also

 Carta (disambiguation)
 Karra (disambiguation)